Caesar Cervin is a retired American soccer midfielder. He played professionally in the Major Indoor Soccer League, United Soccer League and Southwest Indoor Soccer League (SISL).  He later coached teams in the SISL where he was the 1991 Coach of the Year, USISL, Lone Star Soccer Alliance and was a fourteen-year assistant coach with the Dallas Sidekicks.

Player
While born in Texas, Cervin grew up in Mexico.  After graduating from high school, he attended Southern Methodist University where he played on the men's soccer team.  In 1978, he signed with the Cleveland Force of the Major Indoor Soccer League.  He then played an unknown number of seasons with the Wichita Wings.  In 1981, he signed with the Dallas Tornado of the North American Soccer League, but saw no first team games.  In March 1982, he signed with the Oklahoma City Slickers of the American Soccer League.  In June 1982, the Slickers released him after he failed to enter a game.  He returned to Dallas where he was a "part-owner of an automotive repair shop".  In 1985, he played for the Dallas Americans in the United Soccer League.  In 1989, he signed with the Addison Arrows of the Southwest Indoor Soccer League.  In 1990, he both coached and played for the FC Dallas of the Lone Star Soccer Alliance.

Coach
In 1982, Norman High School hired Cervin as head coach of the boys' soccer team.  In 1990, he coached FC Dallas in the Lone Star Soccer Alliance.  He took Dallas to the LSSA championship where they fell to the Oklahoma City Spirit.  Later that year, he was hired by the Dallas Sidekicks of Major Indoor Soccer League as an assistant coach.  He remained with the Sidekicks until 2004.  In 1991, he coached the Fort Worth Kickers in the Southwest Independent Soccer League.  He was the SISL Coach of the Year.  During the 1994-1995 USISL season, he coached the expansion Mesquite Kickers.  In 1996, he returned to the Fort Worth Kickers, now known as the Dallas Lightning.  On September 9, 2008, the Texas Outlaws of the Professional Arena Soccer League hired Cervin.

References

External links

 Photo of Cervin with the Dallas Sidekicks
 MISL stats

American soccer coaches
American soccer players
American Soccer League (1933–1983) players
Cleveland Force (original MISL) players
Dallas Americans players
DFW Tornados players
Lone Star Soccer Alliance coaches
Lone Star Soccer Alliance players
Major Indoor Soccer League (1978–1992) players
Oklahoma City Slickers (ASL) players
USISL players
SMU Mustangs men's soccer players
United Soccer League (1984–85) players
USISL coaches
Wichita Wings (MISL) players
Living people
Association football forwards
1967 births